"Overload" is the debut single of British girl group Sugababes. It was released on 11 September 2000 through London Records as the lead single from the group's debut studio album, One Touch (2000). At the time, the group consisted of Siobhán Donaghy, Mutya Buena and Keisha Buchanan. It was co-produced and co-written by British songwriters and producers Paul Simm, Felix Howard, Jony Rockstar and Cameron McVey. The general theme of the song involves a teenage girl's crush towards a boy and her finding the situation difficult to manage.

The song was listed at 432 on Pitchfork Media's Top 500 songs of the 2000s. It received an overwhelmingly positive reception from music critics. The song features on the soundtrack to the 2001 film High Heels and Low Lifes, directed by Mel Smith, and the 2002 film 40 Days and 40 Nights, directed by Michael Lehmann. The song was nominated for "Best British Single" at the 2001 BRIT Awards and later inspired the title of the group's greatest hits compilation Overloaded: The Singles Collection. English indie pop band Bastille covered the song for the soundtrack of the 2015 film Kill Your Friends.

Background
"Overload" was co-written by group members Keisha Buchanan, Mutya Buena, and Siobhán Donaghy together with the song's co-producers Cameron McVey, Paul Simm and long-time Sugababes contributor, Jony Rockstar. The track fuses together styles of soul and hip-hop and features contributions of numerous instruments, including: drum, bass, keyboard, electric guitar and horns.

Composition
"Overload" is a pop and R&B song with elements of soul and hip hop. Amy Raphael of The Observer described it as a "smoothly produced, seductive R&B track". According to the digital sheet music published by EMI, the song is written in the key of F Phrygian dominant using common time, at a tempo of 125 beats per minute. The Sugababes' vocal range in the song spans from the lower note of F3 to the higher note of G5. The song's chorus line, "Train comes, I don't know its destination", is sung in doubled octaves. Matthew Horton of Virgin Media noted that the song contains "huffling beats, honeyed vocals and surf guitar".

Critical reception
"Overload" received universal critical acclaim from music critics. NME regarded the song's quality as "hauntingly infectious", and praised the track as irresistible and radio-friendly. The Portland Mercury also considered the song irresistible, and applauded its "snappy pop harmonies" and "jazzy dance beats". Sydney Morning Herald called the track "disarmingly sophisticated". Cameron Adams of Herald Sun wrote that "Overload" is one of the group's "finest moments", and reflected upon this as to why the song does not resemble those released by other girl groups. The Observers Kitty Empire called the song a "brilliant" hit with "unexpected class", and cited it as the starting point of the Sugababes' "course to stardom".

Digital Spy considered "Overload" one of the best debut singles by a British girl group, whilst it also made NMEs Year End Top 10 Singles for the year of 2000. Pitchfork included it at number 432 on their Top 500 Tracks of the Decade list in 2009. In October 2011, NME placed it at number 51 on its list "150 Best Tracks of the Past 15 Years". In 2014 they included it at number 493 on their list of the 500 Greatest Songs of All Time.

Chart performance
"Overload" entered the UK Singles Chart at number six on 23 September 2000. The following week, it dropped to number nine for two consecutive weeks, and eventually spent a further five weeks on the chart. "Overload" has sold approximately 160,000 copies in the United Kingdom, ranking it as their ninth best-selling single. In Ireland, "Overload" debuted at number 25 and reached its peak of number 15 five weeks later. It was the group's only single from the One Touch era to reach the top-twenty in Ireland. "Overload" entered the singles chart in Austria at number 34 on 21 January 2001, and later reached number three for two consecutive weeks, spending an additional three weeks in the chart's top-ten. It became the group's second-best performing single in Austria to-date.

In Germany, "Overload" debuted at number four and reached number three two weeks later. The song managed to spend six weeks in the chart's top-ten, and was certified Gold by the Bundesverband Musikindustrie, denoting shipments of 250,000 copies of the single. "Overload" reached number five in Switzerland and spent 29 weeks on the chart. In Norway, "Overload" debuted at number 17 and held the position for three consecutive weeks; it reached a peak position of number 12 in its fourth week on the chart. The single attained top-twenty in the Netherlands and top-forty positions in the Flanders and Wallonia regions of Belgium. The song reached number 21 in Sweden and spent 17 weeks on the chart. "Overload" also became a commercial success in New Zealand, where it peaked at number two. In Australia, the song peaked at number 27 for two non-consecutive weeks.

Music video
The music video for "Overload" was directed by Phil Poynter and filmed in London, England in August 2000. The video has no plot and is known for its fresh and simplistic style, a theme that they would continue in their early videos. It features the group in a variety of ever-changing outfits, singing the song in front of a plain white background, either by themselves or together as a group.

Track listingsNotes'
 denotes additional producer(s)

Charts

Weekly charts

Year-end charts

Certifications

References

2000 songs
2000 debut singles
London Records singles
Song recordings produced by Cameron McVey
Songs written by Cameron McVey
Songs written by Jony Rockstar
Songs written by Keisha Buchanan
Songs written by Mutya Buena
Songs written by Paul Simm
Sugababes songs